Pedavegi mandal is one of the 28 mandals in Eluru district of the Indian state of Andhra Pradesh. It is administered under Eluru revenue division and its headquarters are located at Pedavegi. The mandal is bounded by Eluru mandal, Denduluru mandal, Kamavarapukota mandal.

Towns and villages 

 census, the mandal has 28 settlements. Pedavegi is the most populated and Rajampalem is the least populated village in the mandal.

The settlements in the mandal are listed below:

See also 
West Godavari district

References

Mandals in Eluru district